Chao Fong-pang (born 15 September 1967 in Kaohsiung, Taiwan) is a Taiwanese professional pool player.

Career
He won the WPA World Nine-ball Championship in 1993 against Thomas Hasch of Germany. Thus, he became the first male Chinese Taipei player to win a world championship in pocket billiards. 

In 1995, he won the International Challenge of Champions against Japan's Takeshi Okumura, who was won the 1994 world champion in nine-ball.

Three year later, he won the gold medal in the eight-ball event of the Asian Games.

Chao regained the World Nine-ball Championship for the second time in 2000 by defeating Mexico's Ismael Paez, 17–6. The score was the largest winning margin ever made in a World Championship final.

In 2001 Chao won the International Challenge of Champions for the second time, defeating Francisco Bustamante who won the event in 1999. He won the event for a third time in 2005 with a victory over the defending champion Thomas Engert.

Titles
 2005 International Challenge of Champions
 2001 International Challenge of Champions
 2000 WPA World Nine-ball Championship
 1998 Asian Games Eight-ball Singles
 1997 Asian 9-Ball Championship
 1996 Asian 9-Ball Championship
 1995 International Challenge of Champions 
 1993 WPA World Nine-ball Championship

References

Living people
1967 births
Taiwanese pool players
World champions in pool
Place of birth missing (living people)
Sportspeople from Kaohsiung
Asian Games medalists in cue sports
Cue sports players at the 1998 Asian Games
Asian Games gold medalists for Chinese Taipei
Asian Games silver medalists for Chinese Taipei
Asian Games bronze medalists for Chinese Taipei
Medalists at the 1998 Asian Games
WPA World Nine-ball Champions